A list of notable bassoonists.

Australia
George Dreyfus
Lyndon Watts
Matthew Wilkie

Austria
Milan Turković

Belgium
Jean-Théodore Radoux (1835-1911)

Bulgaria
Marin Valtchanov (1949-2017)

Canada
Bill Douglas
Pierre Mercure (1927-1966)
George Zukerman

Czechia
Antoine Bullant (1751-1821)
Ludwig Milde (1849-1913)
Václav Vonášek

Denmark
Peter Bastian (1943-2017)
Kjell Roikjer (1901-1999)
Asger Svendsen

Estonia
Martin Kuuskmann

France

Maurice Allard (1922-1988)
Adolphe Blaise (1737-1772)
François Devienne (1759-1803)
Désiré Dihau (1833-1909)
François-René Gebauer (1773-1845)
Eugène Louis-Marie Jancourt (1815-1901)
Fernand Oubradous (1903-1986)
Étienne Ozi (1754-1813)

Germany

Carl Almenräder (1786-1846)
Marc Engelhardt
Albrecht Holder
Klaus Thunemann
Julius Weissenborn (1837-1888)

Iran
Alireza Motevaseli

Israel

Mordechai Rechtman
Uzi Shalev

Italy

Raimondo Inconis
Enzo Muccetti (1912-1977)
Sergio Azzolini
Rino Vernizzi

Japan
Hideo Kachi

Netherlands
Thom de Klerk (1912-1966)
Bram van Sambeek

New Zealand
Peter Musson

Norway
Per Hannevold

Switzerland
Willy Hess (1906-1977)

Ukraine
Volodymyr Apatsky

Uruguay
Gustavo Núñez

United Kingdom

Meyrick Alexander
Roger Birnstingl
Gwydion Brooke (1912-2005)
Archie Camden (1888-1979)
Michael Chapman (1934-2005)
Karen Clark 
Margaret Cookhorn
Lindsay Cooper (1951-2013)
Charles Cracknell (1915-1997)
Edward Elgar (1857-1934)
Vernon Elliott (1912-1996)
Martin Gatt
Rachel Gough
John Hebden (1712-1765)
Cecil James (1913-1999)
Ursula Leveaux
Gordon Laing
David Munrow (1942-1976)
John Orford
Laurence Perkins
Julie Price
Hannah Rankin
Graham Sheen
Philip Turbett
Jeremy Ward
William Waterhouse (1931-2007)

United States

Karen Borca
Garvin Bushell (1902-1991)
Lewis Hugh Cooper
Willard Somers Elliot (1926-2000)
Marvin P. Feinsmith (1932/33-2020)
Dall Fields (1889-1956)
Hugo Fox (1897-1969)
Bernard Garfield
Arthur Grossman
Paul Hanson
K. David van Hoesen (1926-2016)
Benjamin Kamins
Ron Klimko (1936-2012)
Peter Kolkay
Simon Kovar (1890-1970)
Judith LeClair
Tariq Masri
Stephen Maxym (1915-2002)
John Miller Jr.
Anthony R. Parnther
Ray Pizzi
Johnny Reinhard
Peter Schickele
Sol Schoenbach (1915-1999)
Leonard Sharrow (1915-2004)
Wilbur Simpson (1917-1997)
Eric Stomberg
Kim Walker
Sherman Walt (1923-1989)
Arthur Weisberg (1931-2009)
Dan Welcher
Robert S. Williams
Bryan Young

Venezuela
Victor Guillermo Ramos Rangel (1911-1986)

 List
Bassoon